Mânzăteşti may refer to several places in Romania:

Mânzătești, a village in Ungheni Commune, Iași County
Mânzătești, a village in Mălușteni Commune, Vaslui County